Yongin is a city in the Seoul Capital Area, the largest in Gyeonggi Province, South Korea. With a population over 1 million, the city has developed rapidly since the 21st century, recording the highest population growth of any city in the country. Yongin is home to Everland and Caribbean Bay, South Korea's most popular amusement and water parks. The city is also home to the Korean Folk Village, the largest of its kind. Yongin-si is a multi-nuclear city with multiple urban centers, not a single nuclear structure, and Giheung-gu crosses the Yeongdong Expressway and Dongbaek, while Suji-gu crosses Pungdeokcheon Stream and Jukjeon.

Yongin is a city almost as large as Seoul by area, consisting of the highly urbanized districts of Suji-gu and Giheung-gu and the semi-urbanized district of Cheoin-gu. Yongin's urbanized districts are located close to the capital and many commute to and from downtown Seoul in approximately 30–40 minutes by car using the Gyeongbu Expressway or Yongin-Seoul Expressway, the Bundang Line subway, the Shinbundang Line subway or metropolitan buses. The Shinbundang Line with a maximum speed of  extended to Suji-gu in January 2016, which allows Suji residents to travel to Gangnam Station in 25 minutes. The Bundang Line extended south to Giheung Station in December 2011, connecting to EverLine that extends all the way to Everland. In December 2013, the Bundang Line extended to Suwon Station of Seoul Subway Line 1. The 12,000-capacity Yongin Stadium and the 37,000-capacity Yongin Citizen Sports Park Stadium are the largest sports venues in Yongin. Both stadiums are used mostly for football matches.

History
Although there is evidence of human settlement here as far back as the fifth century, Yongin was granted city status only in March 1996.

Geography
Yongin has an inland location in the southern part of Gyeonggi province.

Climate
Yongin has a humid continental climate (Köppen: Dwa) due to its inland location. The average yearly temperature is 11.6°C, the average temperature in January is -3.1°C, the average temperature in August is 25.1°C, and the average yearly precipitation is 1,300mm.

Education
Yongin has many university campuses, namely Yong-In University, noted for its sports courses, Myongji University's Yongin Campus, Hankuk University of Foreign Studies' Yongin Campus, the Police University, Kangnam University (named for its former campus in Gangnam-gu in Seoul), Yong-in Songdam College, Dankook University and Calvin University. Yongin also has many international school campuses, namely Fayston Preparatory School, an Advanced Placement school for Korean students noted for STEM excellence, and Gyeonggi Suwon International School, an IB World School with a boarding program for foreign students.

Administrative districts

The city is divided into three gu (districts):
Cheoin District
Giheung District
Suji District

Demographics

Yongin's population surpassed the 1 million mark in 2017.

Transportation

Yongin is served by trains on the Seoul Metropolitan Subway.  The Bundang Line has been extended into Yongin, calling at Jukjeon, Bojeong, Guseong, Singal, Giheung and Sanggal stations; and it has been extended towards Suwon Station, in Suwon.  Since May 2013 a new line named the EverLine Rapid Transit System is in operation and linked to the Bundang Line at Giheung Station where it is possible to transfer between lines without going outside. From 2016 onwards, the inner Suji area will also be served by four new Shinbundang Line stations, which will allow Suji residents travel to Gangnam Station in less than 30 minutes.

Yongin has an intercity bus terminal in the city centre, though the densely settled northern areas are served better by the terminal in Yatap-dong, Seongnam.

Food
The most representative food of Yongin is the Sundae of Baekam-myeon, Chouin-gu. Baekamsundae has a special feature of filling meat without blood.

Sports
Yongin is the home of the WKBL women's basketball team Yongin Samsung Life Blueminx.

Sister cities

Notable people from Yongin
 Eunkwang – singer and actor, member of K-pop group BtoB
 Sungjae – singer and actor, member of K-pop group BtoB
 Hyungsik – singer and actor, member of K-pop group ZE:A
 Bomin – singer and actor, member of K-pop group Golden Child
 Mino – rapper and producer, member of K-pop boygroup Winner
 Sungyeol – singer and actor, member of K-pop group Infinite
 Chan – singer and actor, member of K-pop group iKon (Originally from Songpa-gu, Seoul)

Attractions
 Everland theme park
 Caribbean Bay water park
 Korean Folk Village
 Munhwa Broadcasting Corporation (MBC) Dramia located at Cheoin-gu, is the filming location of historical dramas such as Moon Embracing the Sun, Jumong, Queen Seondeok and Dong Yi. Viewing tours are available, which includes traditional folk games, historical court dress and archery.

Gallery

See also
List of cities in South Korea

References

External links

City government website (in Korean)
Yongin : Official Seoul City Tourism

 
Cities in Gyeonggi Province